Wilder is an unincorporated community in Fentress County, Tennessee, United States. The community is in the Cumberland Mountains near Cookeville, Tennessee.

History

Early development
Wilder was a planned company town, intended to provide housing for employees of the Fentress Coal and Coke Company. Town planning began in 1901, and the first coal mine opened in 1902. The town was named for the company owner, John T. Wilder. It was well established by 1903, including the first school in the area. The town church, Boyer's Chapel, was built in 1922. In 1923, the school began adding high school classes, and the first high school graduates were the class of 1932.

Killing of union leader Barney Graham
Wilder was the site of a violent coal-miners strike from July 1932 to April 1933, after wages had been cut by twenty percent. The strike ended shortly after the killing of United Mine Workers union leader Barney Graham in front of the company store on April 30, 1933. His funeral was attended by almost a thousand people. Company mine guard Jack "Shorty" Green was acquitted of a murder charge. The mine never recovered from the destructive events of the strike, and the seam still contains tens of millions of tons of recoverable coal.

Hedy West's 1965 album Old Times and Hard Times included the song The Davidson-Wilder Blues about the coal-miners strike, and the song Lament For Barney Graham specifically about the killing of Graham.

Demographics
The community reached a population of 2,350 in 1924 as a coal-mining town with over 10,000 people living in the general area, but had declined to about 400 by 1957, and an estimated population of 249 in 2013.

Notable people
Bettye Fahrenkamp (1923–1991), Alaska state senator and educator, was born in Wilder.

Gallery

References

Unincorporated communities in Fentress County, Tennessee
Unincorporated communities in Tennessee
Coal towns in Tennessee